Comparative Literature Studies (CLS) is an academic journal in the field of comparative literature. It publishes essays ranging across the traditions of Africa, Asia, Europe, and North and South America. Articles also explore movements, themes, forms, the history of ideas, relations between authors, and the foundations of literary and cultural criticism and theory. Each issue includes reviews of significant books of literary criticism that fall under the rubric of comparative literature noted above.

History 
Comparative Literature Studies was first published in 1963 at The University of Maryland at College Park by the founding editors, Alfred Owen Aldridge and Melvin J. Friedman. The first issue, published in 1963, was a special advance issue; it was "devoted entirely to the Proceedings of the First Triennial Meeting of the American Comparative Literature Association." The regular issues began to be published the next year, in 1964, with four issues each year. In their introductory written remarks on the establishment of the journal and its purpose printed in the first issue, the editors emphasized that the journal would "feature articles on literary history and the history of ideas, with particular emphasis on European literary relations with both North and South America." It gradually broadened this focus to include literature from Asia and Africa as well. Aldridge continued as editor through 1988. The journal's prize competition for best comparative essay by a graduate student is named after him.

Volumes 4, no. 3 (1967) to 23, no. 4 (1986) were published at the University of Illinois at Urbana under the auspices of its Program in Comparative Literature. From volume 24, no. 1 (1987), it began to be published by the Penn State University Press. Aldridge continued as editor throughout, but with issue 24.1, Stanley Weintraub joined him as co-editor. In 1989, Aldridge became editor emeritus and Gerhard F. Strasser joined Stanley Weintraub as co-editor. In 1992, beginning with volume 29, no. 3, Stanley Weintraub also became editor emeritus and Robert R. Edwards became editor-in-chief. Since 2001, Thomas O. Beebee is editor-in-chief.

Institutional affiliation 
Comparative Literature Studies is currently published by the Penn State University Press and is distributed by the Johns Hopkins University Press. The journal is published under the auspices of the Department of Comparative Literature in the College of the Liberal Arts at the Pennsylvania State University.

Special issues 
The journal is published quarterly. One volume, containing the four quarterly issues, is published annually. One of the regular issues concerns East-West literary and cultural relations and is edited in conjunction with members of the College of International Relations at Nihon University located in Mishima, Japan.

A. Owen Aldridge Prize 
Comparative Literature Studies publishes an annual prize-paper written by a graduate student. The competition is named in honor of A. Owen Aldridge, founder of the journal. The purpose of this competition is to encourage and recognize excellence in scholarship among graduate students and to reward the highest achievement by publication. This project is sponsored in cooperation with the American Comparative Literature Association and supported by the Department of Comparative Literature at Penn State. The award carries a monetary prize as well, including an honorarium and help with travel expenses to attend the American Comparative Literature Association meeting.

External links
 
 Current Issue
 Journal Archive
 Comparative Literature Studies on the Penn State Press website
 Comparative Literature Studies on the Johns Hopkins University Press website

English-language journals
Literary magazines published in the United States
Publications established in 1963
Quarterly journals
Penn State University Press academic journals